Hadji Barry (born 8 December 1992) is a Guinean professional footballer who plays as a forward for Future FC in the Egyptian Premier League.

Career
Barry moved from Guinea to the United States in September 2006. He attended Greece Olympia High School in Rochester, New York.

After spending two years at Monroe Community College in 2012 and 2013, Barry later went on to spend two further years in college at the University of Central Florida in 2014 and 2015.

Barry was drafted 13th overall in the 2016 MLS SuperDraft by Orlando City.

He made his professional debut on March 6, 2016 against Real Salt Lake as a 77th-minute substitute.

He was loaned to Orlando City B in March 2016.

Barry signed with USL Championship side Swope Park Rangers on 15 January 2018.

On 18 December 2018, Barry joined Israeli Premier League side Ironi Kiryat Shmona on a -year deal.

Barry rejoined the USL Championship by signing with Ottawa Fury on July 30, 2019.

On 1 January 2020, Barry moved to USL Championship side North Carolina FC.

On 26 January 2021, Barry again moved to a USL Championship side, joining Colorado Springs Switchbacks. Barry won the 2021 USL Championship Golden Boot by matching the league single-season scoring record with 25 goals.

On 3 October 2022, it was announced Barry had joined Egyptian Premier League side Future FC, for a transfer fee described as the largest received in USL Championship history.

International career
Barry made his debut for the Guinea national football team in a 1–1 2019 Africa Cup of Nations qualification tie with Ivory Coast on 18 November 2018.

Personal
Barry holds a U.S. green card which qualifies him as a domestic player for MLS roster purposes.

Barry became a U.S. Citizen on October 25, 2018 

After his father died in 2020, Barry honored him with the name "Baba" on his jersey for the remainder of the season.

Honours
Individual
 USL Championship MVP: 2021
 USL Championship Golden Boot: 2021
 USL Championship All-League First-team: 2021
 USL Championship All-League Second-team (2): 2018, 2022

References

External links 
 

1992 births
Living people
Association football forwards
Colorado Springs Switchbacks FC players
Expatriate footballers in Egypt
Expatriate footballers in Israel
Expatriate soccer players in the United States
Guinean footballers
Guinea international footballers
Guinean expatriate footballers
Hapoel Ironi Kiryat Shmona F.C. players
Major League Soccer players
Monroe Community College alumni
North Carolina FC players
Orlando City SC draft picks
Orlando City SC players
Orlando City B players
Orlando City U-23 players
Ottawa Fury FC players
Soccer players from New York (state)
Sportspeople from Rochester, New York
Sporting Kansas City II players
UCF Knights men's soccer players
USL Championship players
USL League Two players